Holland (publisher) (Uitgeverij Holland) is an independent  Dutch publishing house of books for children and books for adults, founded  in 1921 by Jan Bernhard van Ulzen in Amsterdam.

From 1921 until 1951
After having worked a few years as a sales representative for several publishing houses Jan Berhard van Ulzen established his own publishing business  at his home address. The first publications were financed by his wife who had been a successful fashion cutter in Paris. After a few years the business could be located on the canal Herengracht in Amsterdam. In these years Holland specialized in social, Christian publications by original Dutch writers. A few translations were published, for instants (1937) Søren Kierkegaard, (1951) Pär Lagerkvist, and (1940) Denis de Rougemont.  Next to books Holland also published a Christian literary magazine called Opwaartsche Wegen, which was published for 17 years. Poetry was published since 1950 in a series called De Windroos

From 1951 until 1981
 In 1951 Jan Bernhard van Ulzen was assisted by his son Rolf van Ulzen, who succeeded in the late sixties of the previous century.  As Rolf van Ulzen had started to participate in large international co-productions for encyclopaedia's and fairy tales, the location for office and warehouse in Amsterdam was no longer suitable. The lofts on the Herengracht were not strong enough to bear the weight of heavy books. The building in Haarlem was more suitable with storage possibilities on the ground floor.
In 1955 (Bonte Boekjes series) he started with children's book. For these scripts  he asked poets  as he thought the imagination for poetry must be the same as for children's books.

From 1981 until today
In 1981 Rolf van Ulzen was assisted by his son Ruurt van Ulzen, who succeeded in 1987. The children's books were expanded by new Dutch authors, such as:
 
 ,
 ,
 ,
 ,
 ,
 ,
 Peter Smit

Translated children's book writers
From several foreign children's book writers translations were made, such as:

From English 
 Joan Aiken
 Malcolm Bosse
 Susan Cooper
 Gary Crew
 Scott O'Dell
 Paula Fox
 Frances Mary Hendry
 Mollie Hunter
 Gene Kemp
 Sue Mayfield
 Mary Norton (author)
 Katherine Paterson
 Arthur Ransome
 Elizabeth George Speare
 Catherine Storr
 Mildred D. Taylor
 Sean Taylor (author)

From German 
 Karl Bruckner
 Willi Färhrmann
 Ursula Fuchs
 Susanne Fulcher
 Tilde Michiels
 Gudrun Mebs
 Marietta Moskin
 Tillman Röhrig
 Angela Sommer-Bodenburg
 Ingrid Uebe

Others 
 Maurice Druon
 Maria Grippe
 Torill Hauger
 Marita Lindquist

Classics like Greek- and Roman Myths by Gustav Schwab, Tales of Shakespeare by Charles Lamb and Mary Lamb and small biographies of famous philosophers by Paul Strathern were published in Dutch translation.

References

Sources
 
 Dutch Publishers Association
 Dutch Wikipedia
 Independent Dutch Publishers
 Interview in Boekenwereld by Prof. Dr. Lisa Kuitert with Ruurt van Ulzen, Jaargang 19, nummer 1, oktober 2002

External links
 

Holland(publisher)
Publishing companies established in 1921
Mass media in Amsterdam